Callum Benjamin Ilott (born 11 November 1998) is a British racing driver competing in the NTT IndyCar Series for Juncos Hollinger Racing. He was the official reserve driver for Alfa Romeo for the 2021 Formula One World Championship season and 2022 Miami Grand Prix. Ilott was runner-up to Mick Schumacher in the 2020 Formula 2 Championship. He is currently a member of the Ferrari Driver Academy, though on a "gap year" racing in IndyCar in 2022.

Open-wheel racing career

Karting
Making his debut in 2008, he saw his first win in 2011 in the Formula Kart Stars, and finished third in the German Junior Karting Championship, both in KF3. He remained in KF3 with Chiesa Corse Team for the 2012 season, with much success. Ilott put himself on the radar at age 13 by winning the WSK Masters Series, the WSK Final Cup, and finishing as runner-up in the WSK Euro Series and the CIK-FIA World Cup. He was selected as the youngest ever WSK Driver of the Year. In 2013 he contested in KF and KF2 machinery and won the Trofeo delle Industrie and the WSK Final Cup. In 2014, with Zanardi Strakka Racing, he finished fourth in the CIK-FIA World Championship, third in the WSK Champions Cup, and won the WSK Super Masters Series, as well as the CIK-FIA European Championship.

Toyota Racing Series
Callum Ilott made his single-seater debut in the Toyota Racing Series with ETEC Motorsport, using a helmet with the Red Bull livery, but unofficially announced as a member of the Red Bull driver development programme. He took a fourth in the seventh race, and in Taupo was the quickest in the practice sessions. In  he finished near the podium. He finished 16th in the championship, being fast in qualifying and practices but struggled for race pace.

FIA Formula 3 European Championship

2015 
Ilott stepped up to Formula Three in 2015, racing in the FIA European Formula 3 Championship with Carlin at age of 16. Despite being a rookie, his pace placed him as one of the title contenders before the start of the season. He tested F3 machinery and Formula Renault 2.0 to accumulate experience before his Formula 3 debut. In the preseason testing, Ilott made his first impressions, finishing sixth in his first collective test  and second in wet conditions on his second day. Ilott achieved one podium at the Nürburgring, finished seventh in the Rookie Championship and twelfth in the overall standings.

2016 
For the 2016 season, Ilott switched to Van Amersfoort Racing alongside rookies Pedro Piquet, Harrison Newey and Anthoine Hubert. In the second race of the first round at Circuit Paul Ricard, Ilott took his first victory in the sport and a second victory at the Red Bull Ring resulting in an overall sixth-place finish.

2017 
On 22 November 2016, Ilott was confirmed to be racing with Prema Powerteam for the 2017 season. He improved to fourth in the driver standings, losing to his teammate Maximilian Günther by 39 points. Ilott won six races and finished another six races on the podium, helping Prema Powerteam secure the Teams' championship title for the fifth consecutive season.

GP2 Series
In December 2016, Ilott tested with ART Grand Prix in the post-season test at Yas Marina.

GP3 Series
After GP3 Series tests at Abu Dhabi it was announced that Ilott was scheduled to race with ART Grand Prix in the 2018 GP3 Series. He finished in 3rd place, only behind teammates Nikita Mazepin and the late Anthoine Hubert. He scored seven podiums, two of them being victories.

FIA Formula 2 Championship

2017 
In July 2017, Ilott made his debut at the sixth round at Silverstone with Trident Racing. He finished both races outside the top-ten positions.

2019 

In 2018, after racing a season of GP3, Ilott took part in the Formula 2 post-season test with Trident and Charouz Racing System.

He then raced a full season in F2, finishing 11th in the overall standings, securing two podiums in the sprint races in Catalunya and Sochi respectively and his maiden pole in Monza.

2020 
For the 2020 season, Ilott left Sauber Junior Team by Charouz and joined 2019 teams' championship runner-up UNI-Virtuosi Racing alongside Zhou Guanyu. He remained a member of the Ferrari Driver Academy. Ilott took his first Formula 2 victory at the delayed season's opening race at the Red Bull Ring after pole sitter Zhou suffered electrical problems. Ahead of the season finale, Ilott announced that he would not race in F2 or F1 in 2021. Ilott ended the season with 3 wins, 5 poles and 6 podiums, finishing runner-up to fellow FDA driver Mick Schumacher. Ilott reunited with his former team Charouz Racing System for the first day of the Formula 2 2020 post-season test in Bahrain.

Formula One
Ilott was inducted into the Red Bull Junior Team in 2015 prior to his FIA Formula 3 European Championship debut, however he was dropped from the programme at the end of the year following a winless campaign. After finishing fourth in the championship in 2017, he became a member of the Ferrari Driver Academy.

Ilott had his first experience in a Formula One car during the 2019 in-season test at the Circuit de Barcelona-Catalunya, driving the Alfa Romeo Racing C38. He completed 41 laps before his running was cut short after a crash in Turn 3. Ilott was due to make his Formula One weekend debut during the Friday practice session of the 2020 Eifel Grand Prix, driving for the Ferrari-powered Haas F1 Team, but the session was canceled because of poor weather.

After appearing at the post-season test for Alfa Romeo in December 2020, it was announced that Ilott will be taking the role of Scuderia Ferrari test driver for the 2021 season. In April 2021 he was appointed Alfa Romeo's second reserve driver, sharing duties with fellow reserve Robert Kubica.

Ilott was recalled by Alfa Romeo to serve as their reserve driver for the 2022 Miami Grand Prix.

IndyCar Series

Juncos Hollinger Racing (2021–)

2021 
Ilott signed with Indianapolis-based outfit Juncos Hollinger Racing for the last three races of the 2021 IndyCar Series. He made his debut at the Grand Prix of Portland, where he finished 25th, only completing 77 of the 110 laps due to a mechanical failure mid-race. In the Firestone Grand Prix of Monterey, he crashed his No. 77 car during the warmup session, though he was unharmed by the accident. He went on to finish 22nd, one lap behind the lead pack. In the Acura Grand Prix of Long Beach, Ilott qualified 18th. However, after completing 47 of the 85 laps, he was forced to retire with a mechanical issue, finishing 26th.

2022 

On 24 September 2021, Ilott announced that he would remain with Juncos Hollinger Racing and race full-time for the team in the 2022 IndyCar Series.

Following a crash in the 106th Running of the Indianapolis 500, Ilott broke his right hand and was not given medical clearance to race in the Chevrolet Detroit Grand Prix, which took place the following weekend. He made his return the Sonsio Grand Prix at Road America, where he finished 11th.

On 28 July 2022, it was announced that Ilott has signed a two-year extension with Juncos Hollinger Racing, keeping him with the team through the 2024 season.

Sports car career

GT World Challenge Europe Endurance Cup 
In February 2021, Ilott signed with Italian outfit Iron Lynx to compete in the 2021 GT World Challenge Europe Endurance Cup, driving the No. 71 Ferrari 488 GT3 alongside fellow Ferrari Driver Academy member Antonio Fuoco and Italian driver Davide Rigon.

24 Hours of Le Mans 
Ilott made his 24 Hours of Le Mans debut in the 2021 edition with Iron Lynx, driving the No. 80 Ferrari 488 GTE alongside Italian drivers Matteo Cressoni and Rino Mastronardi. Ilott replaced Andrea Piccini for the race, as Piccini chose to step away from driving and focus on his duties as Iron Lynx team principal. He achieved a podium in his first outing, finishing third in the GTE Am class and 27th overall.

Intercontinental GT Challenge 
Ilott contested the first round of the 2021 Intercontinental GT Challenge, the 24 Hours of Spa, with Iron Lynx Motorsport Lab in the No. 71 Ferrari 488 GT3. Their race ended prematurely, as the No. 71 was involved in a four-car accident during lap 10. In a bid to win the Manufacturer's championship for the first time, Ferrari announced in October 2021 that they would contest the remaining two rounds of the three-round championship. Ilott, alongside Antonio Fuoco and Alessio Rovera (later replaced by Davide Rigon), were announced as drivers in the No. 71 Ferrari entry for the 2021 Indianapolis 8 Hours, this time racing with AF Corse.

Karting record

Karting career summary

Racing record

Racing career summary 

* Season still in progress.

Complete Toyota Racing Series results 
(key) (Races in bold indicate pole position) (Races in italics indicate fastest lap)

Complete FIA Formula 3 European Championship results
(key) (Races in bold indicate pole position) (Races in italics indicate fastest lap)

† Driver did not finish the race but was classified as he completed over 90% of the race distance.

Complete Masters of Formula 3 results

Complete Macau Grand Prix results

Complete GP3 Series results
(key) (Races in bold indicate pole position) (Races in italics indicate fastest lap)

Complete FIA Formula 2 Championship results 
(key) (Races in bold indicate pole position) (Races in italics indicate points for the fastest lap of top ten finishers)

‡ Half points were awarded as less than 75% of the scheduled race distance was completed.

Complete Formula One participations
(key) (Races in bold indicate pole position) (Races in italics indicate fastest lap)

Complete GT World Challenge Europe Endurance results
(key) (Races in bold indicate pole position; races in italics indicate fastest lap)

Complete 24 Hours of Le Mans results

American open-wheel racing results

IndyCar Series
(key)

Indianapolis 500

Notes

References

External links
 
 
 Callum Ilott on Instagram

1998 births
Living people
English racing drivers
Karting World Championship drivers
Toyota Racing Series drivers
FIA Formula 3 European Championship drivers
GP3 Series drivers
FIA Formula 2 Championship drivers
24 Hours of Le Mans drivers
FIA World Endurance Championship drivers
IndyCar Series drivers
Indianapolis 500 drivers
Carlin racing drivers
Van Amersfoort Racing drivers
Prema Powerteam drivers
ART Grand Prix drivers
Charouz Racing System drivers
Virtuosi Racing drivers
Juncos Hollinger Racing drivers
AF Corse drivers
Trident Racing drivers
Sauber Motorsport drivers
Iron Lynx drivers